Sphenocondor is an extinct genus of sphenodontian reptile from the Early Jurassic Cañadón Asfalto Formation of Argentina.

Phylogeny 
A phylogenetic analysis performed by Apestiguia et al. (2012) resulted in the following tree which shows the relationship of Sphenocondor to other rhynchocephalians:

References 

Prehistoric reptile genera
Jurassic lepidosaurs
Middle Jurassic reptiles of South America
Cañadón Asfalto Formation
Fossil taxa described in 2012
Jurassic Argentina